Yugoslavia was present at the Eurovision Song Contest 1986, held in Bergen, Norway, after opting out of the previous year's contest in Gothenburg, Sweden.

Before Eurovision

Jugovizija 1986 
The Yugoslav national final to select their entry was held on 7 March 1986 at the Palace of Youth and Sports in Priština, and was hosted by Enver Petrovci, a renowned theatre actor.

Sixteen songs made it to the national final, which was broadcast by JRT to all of the regions of Yugoslavia. The winner was decided by the votes of eight regional juries (Sarajevo, Zagreb, Skopje, Titograd, Belgrade, Ljubljana, Pristina and Novi Sad).

The winning entry was "Željo moja", performed by Croatian singer Doris Dragović and composed by Zrinko Tutić.

At Eurovision
Dragović was the second performer on the night of the Contest, following Luxembourg and preceding France. At the close of the voting the song had received 49 points, placing 11th in a field of 20 competing countries. The Yugoslav jury awarded its 12 points to Turkey.

Voting

References

External links
Yugoslavian National Final 1986

1986
Countries in the Eurovision Song Contest 1986
Eurovision